Erwin Keller (8 April 1905 – 31 July 1971) was a field hockey player from Germany, who won the silver medal for his native country at the 1936 Summer Olympics in Berlin. 

Four members of his family won gold. His son Carsten Keller captured the gold medal at the 1972 Summer Olympics as did three of his children, all as strikers. Andreas became Olympic champion in 1992 (Barcelona), after winning silver at the two previous Olympics in Los Angeles (1984) and Seoul (1988). Natascha competed in three Olympics, winning gold at the 2004 Summer Olympics in Athens. At the 2008 Summer Olympics  Florian also won the gold medal for Germany.

External links
 
 profile

1905 births
1971 deaths
German male field hockey players
Olympic field hockey players of Germany
Field hockey players at the 1936 Summer Olympics
Olympic silver medalists for Germany
Olympic medalists in field hockey
Medalists at the 1936 Summer Olympics
20th-century German people